Edmund Burke School is an independent college preparatory school in Washington, D.C. Located on Connecticut Avenue NW, two blocks from the Van Ness - UDC metro station, Burke enrolls approximately 315 students in Grades 6-12.

Founded in 1968 by Jean Mooskin and Dick Roth, the school practices progressive education: classes and advisory groups are small, teachers go by their first names, and students are given significant independence.

The school was named for 18th century British parliamentarian and philosopher Edmund Burke. "All that is necessary for the triumph of evil is that good men do nothing," a quote often attributed to Burke, serves as a source of inspiration.

History 
Edmund Burke School was founded in 1968 by Roth and Mooskin, who met while teaching at  the Hawthorne School, which would close in 1982. Burke first opened in a building at 2107 Wyoming Avenue NW and initially enrolled 17 students. Elizabeth Ely, a teacher at Burke when it opened, went on to found The Field School in 1972, and the two schools later became athletic rivals. In 1971, Burke's growth prompted a move to 2120 Wyoming Avenue NW. In 1973, the school purchased 2955 Upton Street NW, which it later expanded to add a gymnasium and other facilities.

In 2003, Burke earned city approval to expand its facilities with a new building that would increase both size and capacity and now includes new computer labs, offices, middle school classrooms, athletic facilities, a theater, and an underground parking garage. A new building, dedicated primarily to the Middle School and the arts, connected with the school's longtime home, opened in 2006.

In summer 2021, Burke began a renovation to the historic high school building, which will result in a new ceramics studio, renovated space for digital and wet photography, community gathering space, new fitness center, and a lunch servery.

Co-founders Mooskin and Roth retired in 1999, and David Shapiro became the Head of School. The current Head of School is Steve McManus.

2022 shooting 
On April 22, 2022, a gunman armed with four rifles modified to fire on fully-automatic and mounted with scopes, along with two handguns and more than 1,000 rounds of ammunition, positioned himself on the fifth floor of an apartment building adjacent to the school. He proceeded to fire at least 239 shots toward the school and other nearby buildings, wounding four people, and breaking glass in the school. During the incident, the gunman posted a video of the shooting on 4chan and edited the school's Wikipedia page to report the incident. About five hours later, police found and breached the apartment of the gunman, identified as 23-year-old Raymond Godfrey Chambers Spencer; they found him dead from a self-inflicted gunshot wound.

Profile 

Burke enrolls approximately 225 high school students (Grades 9-12) and 90 middle school students (Grades 6-8). In 2022-23, those students represent 65 different zip codes in DC, Maryland, and Virginia and 40% self-identify as people of color. The Class of 2022 attended 37 different colleges and universities. The school employs roughly 70 faculty and staff, and 69% hold advanced degrees. The average class size is 12-14 students, with options for independent study and teaching assistantships. All graduating seniors complete an independent senior project.

The school dedicates 15% of its annual budget to Financial Aid and, on average, "32% of Burke families receive financial aid."

Facilities 
The school has two buildings, affectionately dubbed "Calvin" and "Hobbes". The school, while physically small in comparison to others in the area, is home to a black box theater, a gym, library, computer lab, ceramics studio, photography studio, and two music rooms. Burke's athletics teams practice at Howard Field (Howard University School of Law) and UDC Pool/Natatorium (University of the District of Columbia), just across the street. Burke is also located less than 20 minutes (on foot) from Rock Creek Park, National Zoological Park (United States), and Levine School of Music.

Athletics 
The Burke Bengals compete primarily in the Potomac Valley Athletic Conference (PVAC); and the Burke offers varsity teams in Volleyball, Cross Country, Soccer, Basketball, Swimming, Baseball, Track and Field, Ultimate Frisbee, Golf, and Softball, which has won three consecutive championship titles.

Burke has a "no-cut" policy, such that all interested students can have a place on a team, regardless of ability. Varsity teams do require annual tryouts.

Accreditations 

 Association of Independent Maryland and DC Schools
 Middle States Association of Colleges and Schools

Notable alumni 

 Laura Curran, politician and Nassau County (N.Y.) executive
 Christopher Dyer, politician and gay rights activist also known as Cookie Buffet
 Romilio Hernandez, soccer player
 Darko Tresnjak, Tony Award-winning director
 Ben White, financial journalist
 Zach Cregger, director, actor, and comedian

References

External links

Forest Hills (Washington, D.C.)
Private high schools in Washington, D.C.
Educational institutions established in 1968
Private elementary schools in Washington, D.C.
Private middle schools in Washington, D.C.
Preparatory schools in Washington, D.C.
1968 establishments in Washington, D.C.
Edmund Burke